The Mount Sinai Hospital located in Brooklyn (also "Mount Sinai Brooklyn" was founded in 1955 as a private hospital. Like nearby New York Community Hospital, the 3201 Kings Highway facility with a history of name changes 
is One Address, Many Hospitals.

As with Community, its Kosher supervision is under Vaad of Flatbush.

History
Samuel L. Berson opened King Highway Hospital as a proprietary in 1955.

Initially, in 1954, the 3201 Kings Highway building was a nursing home. It became a hospital in 1955, when Berson purchased the building, which he sold in 1995. The names used at this location include:
 Kings Highway Hospital (1955)
 Kings Highway Hospital Center
 Beth Israel Hospital Kings Highway Division (1995)
 Beth Israel Hospital Brooklyn (2012)
 Mount Sinai Hospital Beth Israel Brooklyn (2014)
 Mount Sinai Hospital Brooklyn (2015)

References

External links
 Architectural rendering of Kings Highway Hospital to be constructed at the intersection of East 26th Street and Avenue O

Hospitals in Brooklyn
Midwood, Brooklyn